Glyceryl behenate is a fat used in cosmetics, foods, and oral pharmaceutical formulations. In cosmetics, it is mainly used as a viscosity-increasing agent in emulsions.

In pharmaceutical formulations, glyceryl behenate is mainly used as a tablet and capsule lubricant and as a lipidic coating excipient. It has been investigated for the encapsulation of various drugs such as retinoids. It has also been investigated for use in the preparation of sustained release tablets as a matrix-forming agent for the controlled release of water-soluble drugs and as a lubricant in oral solid dosage formulations. It can also be used as a hot-melt coating agent sprayed onto a powder.

It is used widely in cosmetics as non-comedogenic (non- pimple causing substance) ingredient. It does not clog the oil pores of facial skin.

It is also used widely as ingredient for preparation of lipidic nano-particles such as solid lipid nanoparticles (SLN) and nanostructured lipid carriers (NLC). Chemically, glyceryl behenate is a mixture of various esters of behenic acid and glycerol (glycerides).  The mixture predominantly contains the diester glyceryl dibehenate.

See also
 Behenic acid

References

Food additives
Cosmetics chemicals
Excipients